{{DISPLAYTITLE:C14H14O3}}
The molecular formula C14H14O3 (molar mass: 230.25 g/mol, exact mass: 230.094294 u) may refer to:

 Dihydro-resveratrol, a natural phenol found in wine
 Kavain
 Naproxen
 Pindone

Molecular formulas